Manfred Kluth (born 2 July 1936) is a West German rower who represented the United Team of Germany. He competed at the 1960 Summer Olympics in Rome with the men's coxless four where they were eliminated in the round one repêchage.

References

1936 births
Living people
West German male rowers
Olympic rowers of the United Team of Germany
Rowers at the 1960 Summer Olympics
Sportspeople from Düsseldorf
European Rowing Championships medalists